NBA Slam is an Indian television show about NBA basketball on the Sony SIX channel. It showcases the abilities and on-court rivalry of two rival NBA star players through the eyes of two Indian celebrity fans. The first episode featured Bollywood actor and VJ Rannvijay Singha and VJ Varun Sood.

Episodes

References

National Basketball Association
Indian sports television series